Chila Union is a Union parishad of Mongla Upazila, Bagerhat District in Khulna Division of Bangladesh. It has an area of 78.06 km2 (30.14 sq mi) and a population of 19,009.

References

Unions of Mongla Upazila
Unions of Bagerhat District
Unions of Khulna Division